2018 Dhangadhi Premier League (known as DPL2, for sponsorship reasons, Ruslan DPL 2) is the second season of Dhangadhi Premier League, a franchise Twenty20 cricket league in Nepal. The tournament started on 31 March and ended on 14 April in Dhangadhi. Team Chauraha Dhangadhi were the defending champions.

Venue

Teams and squads 
The 2018 DPL features six team franchises. Kanchanpur Iconics were terminated and they were replaced by Mahendranagar United ahead of the season..

The player draft for the 2018 season was held in Kathmandu on 21 February 2018. 185 domestic players were divided into four different categories. The teams also had to sign two overseas players.

Format

Points table

 Top 4 teams qualified for the playoffs
  Advanced to Qualifier 1
  Advanced to Eliminator

League progression

League stage

Match results

Play-offs

Preliminary

Qualifier 1

Eliminator

Qualifier 2

Final

Statistics

Most runs 

Source: Cricinfo, as of 13 April 2018

Most wickets 

Source: Cricinfo, as of 13 April 2018

Hat-tricks

See also 

 Home
 Everest Premier League
 Dhangadhi Premier League records

References

2018 in Nepalese cricket
Dhangadhi Premier League